The Bymarken Church is a church building at Bymarken in Jönköping, Sweden. Belonging to the Jönköping Sofia-Järstorp Parish of the Church of Sweden, it was opened in 1935.

References

External links

20th-century Church of Sweden church buildings
Churches in Jönköping
Churches completed in 1935
Churches in the Diocese of Växjö